The Battle of the Caecus River was a battle in 241 BC between the Kingdom of Pergamon army commanded by Attalus I, and the Galatian tribes who resided in Anatolia. The battle took place near the source of the Caecus River and resulted in a victory for the Kingdom of Pergamon.

Context 
During the 3rd century BC, there was a large migration of Gauls towards Anatolia. After passing through Greece, they arrived in Asia Minor, where they survived by raiding the towns along the Mediterranean coast. Many of these towns fell under the protection or direct control of the Kingdom of Pergamon, whose king, Eumenes I agreed to pay the Gauls tribute in return for their protection against the barbarians.

This situation changed with the ascendancy of Attalus I (believed to be the second cousin or the grandnephew of Eumenes I) in the year 241 BC. Attalus I decided against continuing the payment of tribute to the Gauls. Attalus I was the first Pergamonese ruler who dared to go against this precedent. The stoppage of payment led to a military mobilization by both the Pergamonese and the Galatians, eventually leading to war between the two parties.

The battle
There are few surviving references that detail the course of this battle. What is known for certain is that the outcome resulted in a decisive victory for Attalus I and the Kingdom of Pergamon.

Consequences 
After the victory at the Caecus River, Attalus I adopted the surname "Sóter" (Greek: Savior) and officially received the title of King of Pergamon. The victory brought Attalus I a status of legendary fame. One historical account salvaged by Pausanias which apparently predated and predicted the battle states the following:

According to this same author, the "son of the bull", the "one with bull horns" is a reference to Attalus I as the king had a bullish complexion according to him. In recognition of this victory, a monument was erected at the acropolis of Pergamon that included the famous sculptures the Dying Gaul and the Ludovisi Gaul.

After the defeat, the Galatians continued to be a serious threat to the states of Asia Minor. In fact, they continued to be a threat even after their defeat by Gnaeus Manlius Vulso in the Galatian War. From this point until the region's annexation by the Roman Republic, they were virtually ignored as they had no access to the sea.

See also 
 Galatia
 Hellenistic period

References 

Caecus
Caecus
the Caecus River
Ancient Galatia